Allan Beswick (30 June 1870 – 6 September 1908) was a South African international rugby union player who played as a forward.

He made 3 appearances for South Africa against the British Lions in 1896.

References

South African rugby union players
South Africa international rugby union players
1870 births
1908 deaths
Rugby union forwards
Rugby union players from the Eastern Cape
Alumni of Queen's College Boys' High School